Dawn Henderson Beam (born May 15, 1964) is an associate justice of the Supreme Court of Mississippi.

Biography

Dawn Beam was born May 15, 1964 in Marks, Mississippi. She earned a Bachelor of Arts in business from the University of Mississippi and a law degree from the University of Mississippi School of Law. She was admitted to the Mississippi Bar in 1989.

State court service
Previously, Beam was a judge for the 10th Chancery District in Mississippi. She was re-elected on November 4, 2014, for a term that began in 2015 and would have expired in 2018.

Service on Supreme Court of Mississippi

On December 28, 2015 Governor Phil Bryant appointed Beam to fill the remaining 10-month term of Justice Randy G. Pierce, who resigned on February 1, 2016.

Advocacy

In her early career, she worked extensively in child support enforcement. Her work as a chancellor and as a county prosecutor included protection of abused and neglected children. After her appointment to the Supreme Court, she continued work for the protection of children as co-chair of the Commission on Children's Justice and ReNewMS. She spearheaded efforts to organize Rescue 100 programs to train more foster parents.

Personal

Beam makes her home in Sumrall. She is a member of Sumrall United Methodist Church in Lamar County.	She is married to Dr. Stephen Beam. They have five children.

Her sister is currently serving a prison sentence for multiple federal counts of fraud, mail fraud and money laundering after admitting to swindling veterans and the elderly out of more than $2 million.

References

External links
Official Biography on Mississippi Supreme Court website

1964 births
Living people
Justices of the Mississippi Supreme Court
University of Mississippi alumni
University of Mississippi School of Law alumni
Mississippi lawyers
American women lawyers
People from Quitman County, Mississippi
21st-century American judges
21st-century American women judges